Ptychagnostus atavus is a species of agnostid trilobite. It was originally described by Swedish paleontologist Sven Axel Tullberg as Agnostus atavus in 1880. It is used in biostratigraphy as an index fossil. Its first appearance at the GSSP section in the Wheeler Shale of Utah is defined as the beginning of the Drumian Age (around  million years ago) of the Miaolingian (Middle Cambrian).

Laurie (2008)  grouped punctuosus and affinis within Ptychagnostus, but preferred to place the closely related atavus within Acidusus.

References

Agnostoidea
Cambrian trilobites
Fossil taxa described in 1880
Index fossils
Drumian
Wheeler Shale
Drumian species